In American football, passing, along with running, is one of the two methods of advancing the ball downfield. In order to advance the ball via passing, the ball must be caught by a receiver, tallying a reception. In addition to seven pairs of teammates who have rushed for 1,000 yards each in a season, there are five trios of teammates who have caught 1,000 yards each in a season.

Player positions 
Every member of the trios has been a wide receiver, with the exception of Kellen Winslow, a hall of fame tight end, and Eric Metcalf, a multi-purpose running back who set records as a return specialist. Wide receivers usually line up on or near the line of scrimmage, and their principal role is to catch passes. Wide receivers usually have fewer blocking roles in addition to advancing the ball down the field through receptions and rush attempts, unlike tight ends and running backs.

Furthermore, while a rushing play simply involves a handoff, snap, or pitch to a player, a passing requires a quarterback or other passer to throw the ball to the receiver. Every team that had a 1,000-yard receiving trio also had at least 4,000 team passing yards, with the remaining yards to other receivers on the team.

History 

The 1980 San Diego Chargers produced first 1,000-yard trio, consisting of John Jefferson, and Hall of Famers Winslow and Charlie Joiner. Their 3,762 combined yards are the highest total of any 1,000-yard trio. During this season, quarterback Dan Fouts passed for a then-record 4,715 yards under the Air Coryell system instituted by head coach Don Coryell.

The 1989 Washington Redskins produced the second 1,000-yard trio, consisting of wide receivers Art Monk, Gary Clark, and Ricky Sanders. Nicknamed "The Posse", this trio is the only trio who did not have a 4,000-yard quarterback, with two quarterbacks, Mark Rypien (3,768 yards) and Doug Williams (585 yards), needed to break the 4,000 yards passing mark (though Rypien only played 14 games of a 16-game season).

The 1995 Atlanta Falcons produced the third 1,000-yard trio, consisting of running back/wide receiver/return specialist Eric Metcalf and wide receivers Terance Mathis and Bert Emanuel. Metcalf's 104 receptions are the most by any member of a 1,000-yard trio. Quarterback Jeff George passed for 4,143 yards, the only time he passed for over 4,000 yards in his career.

The 2004 Indianapolis Colts produced the fourth 1,000-yard trio, consisting of wide receivers Marvin Harrison, Reggie Wayne, and Brandon Stokley. During this season, quarterback Peyton Manning passed for 4,557 yards and broke the season passing touchdown record of 48 touchdowns, held by Dan Marino, with 49 (which would be broken during the 2007 NFL season by Tom Brady, with 50, but then reclaimed by Manning in the 2013 NFL season).  Harrison's 15 touchdowns are the most of any single receiver and the trio's 37 combined touchdowns are the most of a 1,000-yard trio.

The 2008 Arizona Cardinals produced the fifth and most recent 1,000 yard trio, consisting of wide receivers Larry Fitzgerald, Anquan Boldin, and Steve Breaston. Quarterback Kurt Warner's 4,583 yards were second only to Drew Brees's 5,069 passing yards (which fell 15 yards short of Dan Marino's then-record 5,084 yards). The Cardinals posted a 9-7 record, and advanced to Super Bowl XLIII, losing 27-23 to the Pittsburgh Steelers. Fitzgerald's 1,431 yards are the most of any member of a 1,000-yard trio. Their 262 combined receptions are the most of any 1,000-yard trio.

1,000 yard receiving trios

List of trios with at least 900 receiving yards each

References

External links 
 National Football League

Receiving trios
Receiving
National Football League lists